An oxyacid, oxoacid, or ternary acid is an acid that contains oxygen. Specifically, it is a compound that contains hydrogen, oxygen, and at least one other element, with at least one hydrogen atom bonded to oxygen that can dissociate to produce the H+ cation and the anion of the acid.

Description
Under Lavoisier's original theory, all acids contained oxygen, which was named from the Greek ὀξύς (oxys: acid, sharp) and the root -γενής (-genes: creator). It was later discovered that some acids, notably hydrochloric acid, did not contain oxygen and so acids were divided into oxo-acids and these new hydroacids.

All oxyacids have the acidic hydrogen bound to an oxygen atom, so bond strength (length) is not a factor, as it is with binary nonmetal hydrides. Rather, the electronegativity of the central atom and the number of oxygen atoms determine oxyacid acidity. For oxyacids with the same central atom, acid strength increases with the number of oxygen atoms attached to it. With the same number of oxygen atoms attached to it, acid strength increases with increasing electronegativity of the central atom.

Compared to the salts of their deprotonated forms (a class of compounds known as the oxyanions), oxyacids are generally less stable, and many of them only exist formally as hypothetical species, or only exist in solution and cannot be isolated in pure form.  There are several general reasons for this: (1) they may condense to form oligomers (e.g., H2CrO4 to H2Cr2O7), or dehydrate all the way to form the anhydride (e.g., H2CO3 to CO2), (2) they may disproportionate to one compound of higher and another of lower oxidation state (e.g., HClO2 to HClO and HClO3), or (3) they might exist almost entirely as another, more stable tautomeric form (e.g., phosphorous acid P(OH)3 exists almost entirely as phosphonic acid HP(=O)(OH)2).  Nevertheless, perchloric acid (HClO4), sulfuric acid (H2SO4), and nitric acid (HNO3) are a few common oxyacids that are relatively easily prepared as pure substances.

Imidic acids are created by replacing =O with =NR in an oxyacid.

Properties

An oxyacid molecule contains the structure X−O−H, where other atoms or atom groups can be connected to the central atom X. In a solution, such a molecule can be dissociated into ions in two distinct ways:

 X−O−H ⇄ (X−O)− + H+
 X−O−H ⇄ X+ + OH−

If the central atom X is strongly electronegative, then it strongly attracts the electrons of the oxygen atom. In that case, the bond between the oxygen and hydrogen atom is weak, and the compound ionizes easily in the way of the former of the two chemical equations above. In this case, the compound XOH is an acid, because it releases a proton, that is, a hydrogen ion. For example, nitrogen, sulfur and chlorine are strongly electronegative elements, and therefore nitric acid, sulfuric acid, and perchloric acid, are strong acids.

If, however, the electronegativity of X is low, then the compound is dissociated to ions according to the latter chemical equation, and XOH is an alkaline hydroxide. Examples of such compounds are sodium hydroxide NaOH and calcium hydroxide Ca(OH)2. Owing to the high electronegativity of oxygen, however, most of the common oxobases, such as sodium hydroxide, while strongly basic in water, are only moderately basic in comparison to other bases. For example, the pKa of the conjugate acid of sodium hydroxide, water, is 15.7, while that of sodium amide, ammonia, is closer to 40, making sodium hydroxide a much weaker base than sodium amide.

If the electronegativity of X is somewhere in between, the compound can be amphoteric, and in that case it can dissociate to ions in both ways, in the former case when reacting with bases, and in the latter case when reacting with acids. Examples of this include aliphatic alcohols, such as ethanol.

Inorganic oxyacids typically have a chemical formula of type HmXOn, where X is an atom functioning as a central atom, whereas parameters m and n depend on the oxidation state of the element X. In most cases, the element X is a nonmetal, but some metals, for example chromium and manganese, can form oxyacids when occurring at their highest oxidation states.

When oxyacids are heated, many of them dissociate to water and the anhydride of the acid. In most cases, such anhydrides are oxides of nonmetals. For example, carbon dioxide, CO2, is the anhydride of carbonic acid, H2CO3, and sulfur trioxide, SO3, is the anhydride of sulfuric acid, H2SO4. These anhydrides react quickly with water and form those oxyacids again.

Many organic acids, like carboxylic acids and phenols, are oxyacids. Their molecular structure, however, is much more complicated than that of inorganic oxyacids.

Most of the commonly encountered acids are oxyacids. Indeed, in the 18th century, Lavoisier assumed that all acids contain oxygen and that oxygen causes their acidity. Because of this, he gave to this element its name, oxygenium, derived from Greek and meaning acid-maker, which is still, in a more or less modified form, used in most languages. Later, however, Humphry Davy showed that the so-called muriatic acid did not contain oxygen, despite its being a strong acid; instead, it is a solution of hydrogen chloride, HCl. Such acids which do not contain oxygen are nowadays known as hydroacids.

Names of inorganic oxyacids 

Many inorganic oxyacids are traditionally called with names ending with the word acid and which also contain, in a somewhat modified form, the name of the element they contain in addition to hydrogen and oxygen. Well-known examples of such acids are sulfuric acid, nitric acid and phosphoric acid.

This practice is fully well-established, and IUPAC has accepted such names. In light of the current chemical nomenclature, this practice is an exception, because systematic names of compounds are formed according to the elements they contain and their molecular structure, not according to other properties (for example, acidity) they have.

IUPAC, however, recommends against calling future compounds not yet discovered with a name ending with the word acid. Indeed, acids can be called with names formed by adding the word hydrogen in front of the corresponding anion; for example, sulfuric acid could just as well be called hydrogen sulfate (or dihydrogen sulfate). In fact, the fully systematic name of sulfuric acid, according to IUPAC's rules, would be dihydroxidodioxidosulfur and that of the sulfate ion, tetraoxidosulfate(2−), Such names, however, are almost never used.

However, the same element can form more than one acid when compounded with hydrogen and oxygen. In such cases, the English practice to distinguish such acids is to use the suffix -ic in the name of the element in the name of the acid containing more oxygen atoms, and the suffix -ous in the name of the element in the name of the acid containing fewer oxygen atoms. Thus, for example, sulfuric acid is H2SO4, and sulfurous acid, H2SO3. Analogously, nitric acid is HNO3, and nitrous acid, HNO2. If there are more than two oxyacids having the same element as the central atom, then, in some cases, acids are distinguished by adding the prefix per- or hypo- to their names. The prefix per-, however, is used only when the central atom is a halogen or a group 7 element. For example, chlorine has the four following oxyacids:

 hypochlorous acid HClO
 chlorous acid HClO2
 chloric acid HClO3
 perchloric acid HClO4
Some elemental atoms can exist in a high enough oxidation state that they can hold one more double-bonded oxygen atom than the perhalic acids do. In that case, any acids regarding such element are given the prefix hyper-. Currently, the only known acid with this prefix is hyperruthenic acid, H2RuO5.

The suffix -ite occurs in names of anions and salts derived from acids whose names end to the suffix -ous. On the other hand, the suffix -ate occurs in names of anions and salts derived from acids whose names end to the suffix -ic. Prefixes hypo- and per- occur in the name of anions and salts; for example the ion  is called perchlorate.

In a few cases, the prefixes ortho- and para- occur in names of some oxyacids and their derivative anions. In such cases, the para- acid is what can be thought as remaining of the ortho- acid if a water molecule is separated from the ortho- acid molecule. For example, phosphoric acid, H3PO4, has sometimes been called orthophosphoric acid, in order to distinguish it from metaphosphoric acid, HPO3. However, according to IUPAC's current rules, the prefix ortho- should only be used in names of orthotelluric acid and orthoperiodic acid, and their corresponding anions and salts.

Examples 
In the following table, the formula and the name of the anion refer to what remains of the acid when it loses all its hydrogen atoms as protons. Many of these acids, however, are polyprotic, and in such cases, there also exists one or more intermediate anions. In name of such anions, the prefix hydrogen- (in older nomenclature bi-) is added, with numeral prefixes if needed.

Sources

See also
Weak acid
Hypohalous acid
Sulfur oxoacid

References

External links
 IUPAC definition of "oxoacid" (from the Gold Book)

Acids
Oxoacids